Prince of Tears is the fifth studio album by English musician Baxter Dury. It was released in October 2017 under PIAS.

Track listing

Charts

References

2017 albums
Baxter Dury albums
PIAS Recordings albums